Carole Ann Baskin (née Stairs, formerly known as Carole Murdock and Carole Lewis; born June 6, 1961) is an American animal rights activist and CEO of Big Cat Rescue, a non-profit animal sanctuary based near Tampa, Florida. She has attracted the attention of local, national and international media outlets to the plight of captive big cats.

Baskin drew public attention when she was featured in the 2020 Netflix true crime documentary series Tiger King, which follows Baskin's escalating feud with Oklahoma-based private zoo owner Joe Exotic. Following the release of the series, Baskin received abuse online due to the third episode of the series speculating that Baskin was involved in the disappearance of Don Lewis, her second husband. Baskin denied these claims in a post on Big Cat Rescue's website. Her catchphrase, "Hey all you cool cats and kittens!", also became a meme as a result of Tiger King.

Baskin is also well known for her appearance on Dancing with the Stars, featuring her dancing to a cover of the song "Eye of the Tiger". She and her husband Howard also appeared in the 2021 Louis Theroux documentary Shooting Joe Exotic.

Early life
Carole Ann Stairs was born on June 6, 1961, on the Lackland Air Force Base in Bexar County, Texas. She expressed an interest in saving cats when she was nine, but she decided against pursuing a career in veterinary medicine after she learned that veterinarians euthanize animals. At age 14, Baskin reports having been gang raped by three men who lived across the street from her house, claiming that she received no emotional support from her conservative Christian family. She dropped out of high school and left home with a local roller rink employee. Baskin then hitchhiked back and forth between Florida and Bangor, Maine, sleeping under parked cars. She later purchased a Datsun truck and slept in the back with her pet cat.

Career

Animals 

At the age of 17, Baskin worked at a Tampa, Florida, department store. To make money, she began breeding show cats and used llamas for a lawn trimming business. In January 1991, Baskin married her second husband, Don Lewis, and joined his real estate business. The couple founded Wildlife on Easy Street, an animal sanctuary near Tampa for big cats, in 1992. Originally, Baskin and her husband bred tiger cubs and show cats, but stopped after realising the harm it was doing the animals.

Baskin remains the current chief executive officer of the sanctuary, which she renamed to Big Cat Rescue sometime after Lewis's disappearance in 1997. She has used social media such as Facebook and YouTube and her "The Cat Chat" podcast to promote activism against private zoos.

Dancing with the Stars 
In 2020, Baskin was cast in season 29 of Dancing with the Stars. On the series' September 14 season premiere, she danced a paso doble with partner Pasha Pashkov to Survivor's "Eye of the Tiger" and they received score of a 11 out of a possible 30, the lowest cumulative score of the evening.

Personal life

Relationships 

Baskin moved in with Michael Murdock, her boss at the Tampa department store where she worked, when she was 17. The couple married on April 7, 1979. Baskin has said that she never loved Murdock and married him only because her parents were disappointed that they had been living together outside of marriage. She became pregnant in October 1979 and daughter Jamie Veronica Murdock was born on July 16, 1980.

According to Baskin, in 1981, when she was 19, she threw a potato at Murdock as he attempted to attack her. She ran out of their home barefoot and met her next husband, Don Lewis, on 50th Street in Tampa. She and Lewis engaged in an affair while both were still married. She became one of Lewis's many girlfriends and substantially grew his wealth by helping him buy and sell real estate in 1984. The pair divorced their respective spouses and subsequently married in 1991.

Baskin claimed that Lewis was obsessed with sex and would frequently fly to Costa Rica, where he had substantial real estate holdings, to have affairstiming the trips for whenever she was menstruating. In July 1997, Lewis filed a restraining order against Baskin, stating that she had threatened to kill him; the restraining order was rejected. Baskin claims that he filed the restraining order because she would haul off some of his "junk" property whenever he visited Costa Rica. Lewis continued to live with Baskin afterwards. Lewis told her multiple times that he wanted a divorce, but she did not think he was ever serious about it. She claimed he was diagnosed with bipolar disorder months before he vanished.

Lewis disappeared in August 1997 and was declared legally dead in 2002. A dispute ensued between Baskin and the children of Lewis over his estate, with Baskin prevailing as the primary beneficiary. The case of Lewis' disappearance is still active as of 2021. In September 2020, during the broadcast of Baskin's appearances in Dancing with the Stars in select Florida television markets, including Tampa, Lewis's family and their attorney ran a commercial spot asking for anyone with information on his disappearance to come forward and offered a US$100,000 reward.

Carole met Howard Baskin in November 2002 at a kick-off party for the newly formed No More Homeless Pets organization. He joined Big Cat Rescue soon after as chairman of the advisory board. He proposed to her in November 2003, and they married in November 2004.

In October 2020, Baskin came out as bisexual.

Feud with Joe Exotic, appearances in Tiger King and Shooting Joe Exotic
Baskin had a long-running feud with Joe Exotic, the former owner of the Greater Wynnewood Exotic Animal Park in Wynnewood, Oklahoma. The feud began in 2009 when Big Cat Rescue volunteers initiated an email protest campaign against shopping malls that hosted Exotic's traveling cub-petting shows, prompting many malls to cancel the events. Faced with a loss of income, Exotic responded with a pattern of harassment against Baskin, culminating in rebranding his shows with unlicensed facsimiles of the Big Cat Rescue name and logo and a false Florida phone number; in response, Baskin pursued legal action, alleging that Exotic's trademark infringement damaged the reputation of her organization. In 2013, a court ordered him to pay Baskin $1 million in damages, leading to his bankruptcy. In 2020, he was convicted of attempting to hire a hitman to kill her. Baskin was grateful about his imprisonment, but stated in a video on the Big Cat Rescue website that other big cat owners had been prosecuted as well.

In November 2019, Universal Content Productions announced that they were adapting a Joe Exotic podcast for television, with Kate McKinnon portraying Baskin. This was released as Joe v Carole on Peacock on March 3, 2022. Season 1 Episode 3 alludes to new information of Don Lewis having abused Carole and her minor daughter Jamie years before his disappearance.

In March 2020, Baskin was featured in the Netflix documentary Tiger King. While filming, she and Howard were told that the series would be "the big cat version of Blackfish" and would help stop cub abuse. They were also told that, while Exotic and the disappearance of Don Lewis would be featured in the series, they would not be the focus. Several of the zookeepers featured in the documentary, including Exotic (who had previously made a diss track referencing Lewis' disappearance in 2015) and Tabraue, believe that she was responsible for Lewis' disappearance. After Tiger King was released, Baskin was cyberbullied over her speculated involvement in Lewis' disappearance via Internet memes, including a viral TikTok parody of the Megan Thee Stallion song "Savage" referencing Lewis' disappearance and sung by someone doing an impression of Exotic.

In response, Baskin posted an article on the Big Cat Rescue denying the claims made about her in Tiger King. She called the documentary "salacious and sensational", and criticized directors Eric Goode and Rebecca Chaiklin. Baskin said that she and her husband felt betrayed by the filmmakers, stating she was told the discussion of Joe Exotic and her missing husband were just for context. In a post on the Big Cat Rescue website, Baskin said that the show "has a segment [in the third episode] devoted to suggesting, with lies and innuendos from people who are not credible, that I had a role in the disappearance of my husband Don 21 years ago" and that the series "presents this without any regard for the truth". Baskin has never been charged with anything related to Lewis' disappearance and has always denied having anything to do with it. To defend his wife, Howard released a message on the DailyBigCat YouTube channel, stating that the claims about her being involved in Lewis's disappearance are "nonsense" and that Goode and Chaiklin "did not care about the animals or the truth". In response to Exotic's supporters who posted "free Joe Exotic", the Baskins remarked, "If you sincerely believe that a man who shoots five healthy, beautiful, majestic tigers in the head to make money deserves to be free, we are proud to have you as enemies."

In June 2020, a federal judge granted Exotic's former zoo property to Baskin and Big Cat Rescue on the basis that Exotic fraudulently transferred the zoo's real estate to his mother to avoid creditors, particularly Baskin's judgment against him. Jeff Lowe's zoo operation was given 120 days to vacate the property. After the United States Department of Agriculture suspended the zoo's license in August 2020, citing poor veterinary care, Lowe closed the park permanently. Jeff and Lauren Lowe then relocated all of the big cats to Thackerville, Oklahoma, intending to open a new park there, but the U.S. Justice Department filed a lawsuit citing the Lowes' history of poor animal care; the park never opened and federal authorities seized all 68 big cats from the Lowes in May 2021.

In February 2021, Baskin revealed that she had been asked to feature in a planned second season of the show, but she refused and told the producers to "lose her number". A month later, she was interviewed alongside Howard Baskin by British filmmaker Louis Theroux for the BBC documentary Shooting Joe Exotic, during which they discussed Tiger King and the allegation that Baskin murdered Lewis, which she denied.

On November 1, 2021, the Baskins filed a lawsuit against Netflix and Royal Goode Productions over an alleged breach of contract. They claim that their initial release did not grant the producers liberty to produce derivative works or sequels using the original footage shot of Carole and Howard. The lawsuit requested an injunction to stop the release of the film on November 17, but the same day the suit was filed a U.S. District Judge denied the request. The judge further added that the case would not necessarily entitle the Baskins to financial compensation. The Federal Court in Tampa Bay also denied a preliminary injunction on November 15, 2021, just two days before the show's premiere, after defense attorneys for Netflix said a delay would "hurt marketing momentum" and violate the First Amendment, which in this case would be classified "freedom of the press".  In Tiger King 2 Attorney Joseph Fritz produced a letter by Homeland Security stating that Don Lewis was alive and well in Costa Rica.  Homeland Security didn't exist until 2002, so that had to have been written at least five years after Don Lewis was last seen in Tampa, FL.

Politics
Baskin, and her company Big Cat Rescue, have lobbied Congress to ban the private trade and ownership of exotic cats. Her life's work, and that of her family, included passage of the Big Cat Public Safety Act when it was signed into law on Dec. 20, 2022 by President Joe Biden.  The bill closed the loopholes in the Captive Wildlife Safety Act that she lobbied for from 1998 until its passage in 2003.  The BCPSA bans contact with all big cats and their cubs and phases out private ownership of big cats. Baskin gave exclusively to Democratic candidates from 2005 to 2016, but since 2017 a significant majority of her contributions have gone to Republicans. Recent donations to Democrats included 2020 presidential candidate Cory Booker and Baskin's home Congresswoman Kathy Castor.

Filmography

Television

References

External links

 

Living people
1961 births
21st-century American businesswomen
21st-century American businesspeople
Activists from Florida
American animal rights activists
American podcasters
American women chief executives
American women podcasters
Bisexual women
Businesspeople from Florida
Internet memes introduced in 2020
American LGBT businesspeople
LGBT people from Florida
LGBT people from Texas
People from Bexar County, Texas
Zoo directors
Zoo owners
Victims of cyberbullying
People from Tampa, Florida
Tiger King
21st-century American LGBT people